PDZ domain containing 9 is a protein that in humans is encoded by the PDZD9 gene.

References

External links 
 PDBe-KB provides an overview of all the structure information available in the PDB for Mouse PDZ domain-containing protein 9